The Amelia Island affair was an episode in the history of Spanish Florida. 

The Embargo Act (1807) and the abolition of the American slave trade (1808) made Amelia Island, on the coast of northeastern Florida, a resort for smugglers with sometimes as many as 150 ships in its harbor. In June, 1817, Gregor MacGregor, a Scottish adventurer styling himself the "Brigadier General of the United Provinces of New Granada and Venezuela, and General-in-Chief of the Armies of the Two Floridas", came to Amelia Island. A peripatetic military adventurer, MacGregor, purportedly commissioned by Simón Bolívar, had raised funds and troops for a full-scale invasion of Florida, but squandered much of the money on luxuries. As word of his conduct in the South American independence wars reached the United States, many of the recruits in his invasion force deserted.  Nonetheless, he overran the island with a small force, but left for Nassau in September.

His followers were soon joined by Louis-Michel Aury, formerly associated with MacGregor in South American adventures, and previously one of the leaders of a group of buccaneers on Galveston Island, Texas. After assuming control of Amelia, Aury created an administrative body called the "Supreme Council of the Floridas", directed his secretaries Pedro Gual Escandón and Vicente Pazos Kanki to draw up a constitution, and invited all Florida to unite in throwing off the Spanish yoke. For the few months that Aury controlled Amelia Island, the flag of the revolutionary Republic of Mexico was flown. This was the flag of his supposed clients who were still fighting the Spanish in their war for independence at the time.  The United States, which had plans to annex the peninsula, sent a naval force which captured Amelia Island on December 23, 1817.

References 

Conflicts in 1817
1817 in the United States
Spanish Florida
United States Marine Corps in the 18th and 19th centuries
Amelia Island Affair
June 1817 events
Amelia Island